The 2012 Nordic Figure Skating Championships were held from February 9 to 12, 2012 in Vantaa, Finland. Skaters competed in the disciplines of men's singles and ladies' singles in the senior, junior, and novice levels.

Senior results

Men

Ladies

Source:

Ice dancing

Junior results

Men

Ladies

Novice results

Boys

Girls

References

External links
 official site

Nordic Figure Skating Championships
Nordic Figure Skating Championships
Nordic Championships, 2012
Nordic Figure Skating Championships